CGTP may refer to:

 cyclic guanosine triphosphate
 Confederación General de Trabajadores de Panamá, the General Confederation of Workers of Panama
 Confederação Geral dos Trabalhadores Portugueses, the General Confederation of the Portuguese Workers
 Confederación General de Trabajadores del Perú
 current Good Tissue Practices